A by-election was held for the New South Wales Legislative Assembly electorate of West Sydney on 17 January 1866 because John Robertson had been re-appointed Secretary for Lands in the fourth Cowper ministry. Such ministerial by-elections were usually uncontested however on this occasion a poll was required at both West Sydney and The Williams (Marshall Burdekin). Both Robertson and Burdekin were defeated, with the Cowper government falling, replaced by the second Martin ministry.

Dates

Result

John Robertson was re-appointed Secretary for Lands in the fourth Cowper ministry.

See also
 Electoral results for the district of West Sydney
List of New South Wales state by-elections

References

1866 elections in Australia
New South Wales state by-elections
1860s in New South Wales